Krocylea is an Ancient Greek name of an island in the Ionian Sea, near Ithaca. In Homer's Iliad, book II, Krocylea is part of Odysseus's kingdom. Some researchers, including Wilhelm Dörpfeld estimate that Krocylea is present day island of Atokos or Meganisi.

See also 
Same

Geography of the Odyssey
Islands of Greece
History of the Ionian Islands
Mythological islands
Locations in Greek mythology